Kalanwali 
is a city and a municipal committee in Sirsa district in the Indian state of Haryana. Being very near the Punjab border, most of the people in this area have Punjabi as their mother tongue.

Demographics
 India census, Kalanwali had a population of 25,155. Males constitute 53% of the population and females 47%.  Kalanwali has an average literacy rate of 64% higher than the national average of 59.5%: male literacy is 70%, and female literacy is 58%.  In Kalanwali, 13% of the population is under 6 years of age. Temples in Kalanwali are Hanumaan temple at Dabwali Road, Durga in khuwala Bajar, Shree Shani dev Temple at Railway Road, Kanya Samarak Durga Mandir, Shiv Badi.  There is Dera in Jagmalwali which is 7 km away from the Kalanwali town. There is also a 'samaadh' known as nuniya peer about 4 km putside kalanwali where people offer salt as a remedy to physical illness as well as other day to day problems.

Area around Kalanwali is famous for production of cotton, wheat and vegetables. Prime occupation of people in Kalanwali is farming and trading. Majority of the population speaks Punjabi language while Hindi or Bagri ( Haryanvi) is also spoken amongst a small population of Kalanwali. Adjacent to the kalanwali town is the kalanwali village. The often held regret among kalanwali village people is regarding the absence of even semi-solid roads/streets in the village. While many of the minor villages surrounding kalanwali have solid streets, kalanwali village still finds itself in dusty and muddy streets. Kalanwali is surrounded by rivers and canals though despite all these water bodies, the water supply, both for drinking and irrigation, suffers from time to time.

Education
Kalanwali has 3 government schools. One for primary education, one for girls and another one is common for boys & girls. Apart from having two fully government aided schools and a Vocational Training college, Kalanwali has a few private schools as well. The Millennium School, Bishna Mal Jain Saraswati Vidya Mandir, MPDDAV Senior Secondary School, S.S.D Sr. Sec. School, Satluj High School, Swett Arya High school, Evergreen Royal Public School are the major schools providing their services. Shaheed Bhagat Singh College is providing its Services.

Kalanwali does not have any full functional college and there has been a long-standing demand for a college of higher education for the local students. However, it has not been agreed upon either by government or by any other private institution. In an utter lack of the quality educational institutions, most of the students have to travel to nearby cities like Sirsa and Bhatinda for higher studies after completing senior secondary level in the city.In kalanwali SBS College Also Run Here Students Can do CTI, B.ED , B.A. B.Ed , ANM & GNM Also

Transportation modes
Kalanwali is connected to major railway junctions Delhi and Bathinda by Railway line.  Main railway stations between Kalanwali and Delhi are Sirsa, Aadampur, Hisar, Hansi, Bhiwani, Rohtak, Bahadurgarh.  Kalanwali is connected to nearby locations by bus as well. Bathinda is nearest domestic airport whereas Delhi, Chandigarh are the nearest International airports from Kalanwali. A basic taxi service is available on hire for commuting to near and faraway places. Major up gradation work was started in 2011 to uplift the basic amenities at the railway station as a new rail link between Dabwali and Kalanwali was  proposed in the Rail budget 2009–10 to connect Sirsa with Dabwali Via Kalanwali, Though this work was first partly hampered and then completely stopped later on due to an uninterested political lobby and policies contributing to sluggish implementation.

Villages around Kalanwali
Kalanwali is surrounded by villages including Kurangawali, Chakerian, Jalalana, Chormar, Odhan, AnandGarh, Kheowali, Rohiranwali, Taruana, Desu, Phaggu, Desu Malkana, Pipli, Jagmalwali, Panniwala Ruldu, Takhatmal, Sukhchain, Tirlokewala, Dadu Sahib, Pucca Shahidan, Kewal, Kanakwal, and Rama Mandi. There are around 40 villages surrounding Kalanwali. Takhat Siri Damdma Sahib is about 25 km from Kalanwali.

Banks in Kalanwali 
Kalanwali has the branches of State Bank of India, Punjab National Bank, Oriental Bank of Commerce, The Sirsa Co-operative Bank, The Sarv Haryana Gramin Bank, HDFC Bank, Axis Bank, UCO Bank, Union Bank of India, ICICI Bank and Punjab & Sind Bank. Currently State Bank of India, OBC bank, ICICI Bank, Punjab & Sind Bank, Uco Bank and HDFC Bank provides ATM services in the town.

Markets
Kalanwali has several markets. These are Doctor Market, Mobile Market, Bhagat Singh Market, Sabji Mandi, grain market etc. Kalanwali has its own market to trade cotton, wheat, gwar, barley and more. For this purpose it has its own grain market held in the town. The government has passed a new grain market on Dabwali Road near Bishna Mal Jain Saraswati Vidya Mandir School.
It has also a vegetable market near the railway crossing and in the old town.

References

Cities and towns in Sirsa district

ca:Kalanwali (Haryana)
es:Kalanwali (Haryana)
vi:Kalanwali
zh:卡拉瑙尔